Ján Mucha (born January 11, 1984) is a Slovak professional ice hockey defenceman. He played with HC Karlovy Vary in the Czech Extraliga during the 2010–11 Czech Extraliga season.

References

External links

1984 births
Slovak ice hockey defencemen
HC Karlovy Vary players
Living people
Sportspeople from Malacky
Slovak expatriate ice hockey players in the Czech Republic